Lorenza Indovina (born 5 October 1966) is an Italian actress.

Life and career 
Born in Rome, the daughter of the director Franco Indovina, she studied acting at the Silvio d’Amico Academy of Dramatic Arts, graduating in 1991.  She made her professional debut on stage in 1992, in the drama Il trittico di Antonello by Francesco Crescimone. She is married to writer Niccolò Ammaniti since 2005.

Selected filmography  
 The Rebel (1993)
 The Escort (1993)
 The Truce (1997)
 A Love (1999)  
 Padre Pio: Miracle Man (2000)
 Almost Blue (2000)
 Life as It Comes (2003)
 Inferno Below (2003)
 Sorry, You Can't Get Through! (2005)
 The Past Is a Foreign Land (2008)
 Qualunquemente (2011)
 Tutto tutto niente niente (2012)
 Land of Saints (2015)
 Partly Cloudy with Sunny Spells (2015)
 Burning Love (2015)
 Forever Young (2016)
 Cetto c'è, senzadubbiamente (2019)
 Luna Park (2021)

References

External links 
 

 

Italian film actresses
Italian television actresses
Italian stage actresses
1966 births
Actresses from Rome
Living people
20th-century Italian actresses
21st-century Italian actresses
Accademia Nazionale di Arte Drammatica Silvio D'Amico alumni
People of Sicilian descent